Leo E. Hollister (December 3, 1920 - December 19, 2000) was an American professor emeritus of medicine, psychiatry and pharmacology.

Work on hallucinogens
L. E. Hollister's criteria for establishing that a drug is hallucinogenic are as follows:
 in proportion to other effects, changes in thought, perception, and mood should predominate;
 intellectual or memory impairment should be minimal;
 stupor, narcosis, or excessive stimulation should not be an integral effect;
 autonomic nervous system side effects should be minimal; and
 addictive craving should be absent.

Bibliography

Books

References

American pharmacologists
Psychedelic drug researchers
1920 births
2000 deaths